Stromateoidei is a suborder of the Scombriformes, the largest order of fish. The suborder includes the medusafishes, squaretails and driftfishes which associate with jellyfish, the latter families preying on them while the medusafish use them for protection while scavenging food scraps. In revisions of the Perciformes, the Stromateoidei have been classified as a suborder of the Scombriformes.

Timeline of genera

References

 

 
Ray-finned fish suborders